"Nineteen Forever" is a song by British singer-songwriter and musician Joe Jackson, which was released in 1989 as the lead single from his eighth studio album Blaze of Glory. It was written and produced by Jackson. "Nineteen Forever" reached No. 4 on the US Billboard Modern Rock Tracks and No. 16 on Billboard Album Rock Tracks charts.

The song's music video was directed by Alex Proyas and was Jackson's first since 1982's "Steppin' Out". In line with the song's lyrics about aging rock stars, Jackson appeared in the video with a wig, make-up, prosthetic belly and lame jacket. Jackson performed the song on his 1989 tour with the same costume and would dedicate the song to "all those rock bands on tour this summer after having retired several times".

Critical reception
Upon release, Music & Media described the song as "intelligent pop" and Jackson's "best bet for a hit" since "Steppin' Out". Billboard considered the song a "straightforward, no-frills pop release". In a review of Blaze of Glory, Spin described the song as a "swinging pop anthem".

Park Puterbaugh of Rolling Stone commented: "Another theme [on Blaze of Glory] is the rise of rock & roll, its promises and failures. There [is] a sardonic song about the delusion of wanting to be "Nineteen Forever"." The Philadelphia Inquirer commented: "Nineteen Forever", his attempt at the big-backbeat Jersey sound, calls up a dreamy place, one that puts the sincerity of his vocal in question." Stephen Thomas Erlewine of AllMusic noted "Nineteen Forever" as being a "brisk, stylish pop song".

Track listing
7" single
"Nineteen Forever" - 4:43
"Acropolis Now" (Instrumental) - 4:16

CD single
"Nineteen Forever" - 4:43
"Acropolis Now" (Instrumental) - 4:16

CD single (US promo)
"Nineteen Forever" (Early Fade) - 4:34
"Nineteen Forever" (LP Version) - 5:43

Personnel
 Joe Jackson - lead vocals, harmony vocals, chorus vocals
 Tom Teeley - guitar, chorus vocals
 Vinnie Zummo - electric sitar
 Ed Roynesdal - Hammond organ, syntheiser
 Graham Maby - bass, chorus vocals
 Gary Burke - drums
 Chris Hunter - alto saxophone
 Tony Aiello - tenor saxophone, soloist
 Charles Gordon - trombone
 Michael Morreale, Tony Barrero - trumpet
 Drew Barfield, Joy Askew - chorus vocals

Production
 Joe Jackson - producer, arranger
 Ed Roynesdal - associate producer
 Joe Barbaria - engineer
 Thom Cadley - assistant engineer
 Bridget Daly - mixing assistant
 Bob Ludwig - mastering

Charts

References

1989 singles
1989 songs
Joe Jackson (musician) songs
Songs written by Joe Jackson (musician)